Hamilton is a 2020 American historical fiction musical drama film consisting of a live stage recording of the 2015 Broadway musical of the same name, which was inspired by the 2004 biography Alexander Hamilton by Ron Chernow. Co-produced by Walt Disney Pictures, 5000 Broadway Productions, RadicalMedia, Nevis Productions, and Old 320 Sycamore Pictures, it was directed by Thomas Kail, who also produced the film with Jeffrey Seller and Lin-Manuel Miranda. Miranda, who wrote the music, lyrics, and book for the musical, also stars as Treasury Secretary and Founding Father Alexander Hamilton, along with the musical's original principal Broadway cast, including Leslie Odom Jr., Phillipa Soo, Christopher Jackson, Renée Elise Goldsberry, Daveed Diggs, Anthony Ramos, Jasmine Cephas Jones, Okieriete Onaodowan, and Jonathan Groff.

Originally planned for theatrical release on October 15, 2021, Hamilton was instead released worldwide by Walt Disney Studios Motion Pictures to stream on Disney+ on July 3, 2020. Acclaimed by critics for its visuals, performances, and direction, it became one of the most-streamed films of 2020. The film was named as one of the best films of 2020 by the American Film Institute, and was nominated for Best Motion Picture – Musical or Comedy and Best Actor in a Motion Picture – Musical or Comedy (for Miranda) at the 78th Golden Globe Awards, while Daveed Diggs was nominated for Screen Actors Guild Award for Outstanding Male Actor in a Limited Series or Television Movie. Hamilton was also nominated for twelve Primetime Emmy Awards, and won two, including Outstanding Variety Special.

Synopsis

Cast
 Leslie Odom Jr. as Aaron Burr
 Lin-Manuel Miranda as Alexander Hamilton
 Phillipa Soo as Eliza Hamilton
 Renée Elise Goldsberry as Angelica Schuyler
 Christopher Jackson as George Washington
 Daveed Diggs as Marquis de Lafayette / Thomas Jefferson 
 Anthony Ramos as John Laurens / Philip Hamilton
 Okieriete Onaodowan as Hercules Mulligan / James Madison
 Jonathan Groff as King George III
 Jasmine Cephas Jones as Peggy Schuyler / Maria Reynolds

 Sydney James Harcourt as Philip Schuyler / James Reynolds / Doctor / Ensemble
 Thayne Jasperson as Samuel Seabury / Ensemble
 Jon Rua as Charles Lee / Ensemble
 Ephraim Sykes as George Eacker / Ensemble

Carleigh Bettiol, Ariana DeBose, Hope Easterbrook, Sasha Hutchings, Elizabeth Judd, Austin Smith, and Seth Stewart also appear as ensemble members.

Musical numbers

Act I
 "Alexander Hamilton" – Aaron Burr, John Laurens, Thomas Jefferson, James Madison, Alexander Hamilton, Eliza Schuyler, George Washington, Angelica Schuyler, Maria Reynolds, and Company
 "Aaron Burr, Sir" – Hamilton, Burr, Laurens, Marquis de Lafayette, Hercules Mulligan, and Company
 "My Shot" – Hamilton, Laurens, Lafayette, Mulligan, Burr, and Company
 "The Story of Tonight" – Hamilton, Laurens, Mulligan, Lafayette, and Company
 "The Schuyler Sisters" – Angelica, Eliza, Peggy Schuyler, Burr, and Company
 "Farmer Refuted" – Samuel Seabury, Hamilton, Burr, Mulligan, and Company
 "You'll Be Back" – King George III and Company
 "Right Hand Man" – Washington, Hamilton, Burr, Mulligan, and Company
 "A Winter's Ball" – Burr, Hamilton, Laurens, and Company
 "Helpless" – Eliza, Hamilton and Company
 "Satisfied" – Angelica, Laurens, Hamilton, and Company
 "The Story of Tonight (Reprise)" – Laurens, Mulligan, Lafayette, Hamilton, and Burr
 "Wait for It" – Burr and Company
 "Stay Alive" – Hamilton, Washington, Laurens, Lafayette, Mulligan, Charles Lee, Eliza, Angelica, and Company
 "Ten Duel Commandments" – Laurens, Hamilton, Lee, Burr, and Company
 "Meet Me Inside" – Hamilton, Burr, Laurens, Washington, and Company
 "That Would Be Enough" – Eliza and Hamilton
 "Guns and Ships" – Burr, Lafayette, Washington, and Company
 "History Has Its Eyes on You" – Washington, Hamilton, and Company
 "Yorktown (The World Turned Upside Down)" – Hamilton, Lafayette, Laurens, Mulligan, Washington, and Company
 "What Comes Next?" – King George III
 "Dear Theodosia" – Burr and Hamilton
 "Tomorrow There'll Be More of Us" – Laurens, Eliza, and Hamilton
 "Non-Stop" – Burr, Hamilton, Angelica, Eliza, Washington, and Company

Act II
 "What'd I Miss?" – Jefferson, Burr, Madison, and Company
 "Cabinet Battle #1" – Washington, Jefferson, Hamilton, and Madison
 "Take a Break" – Eliza, Philip Hamilton, Hamilton, and Angelica
 "Say No to This" – Maria Reynolds, Burr, Hamilton, James Reynolds, and Company
 "The Room Where It Happens" – Burr, Hamilton, Jefferson, Madison, and Company
 "Schuyler Defeated" – Philip, Eliza, Hamilton, and Burr
 "Cabinet Battle #2" – Washington, Jefferson, Hamilton, and Madison
 "Washington on Your Side" – Burr, Jefferson, Madison, and Company
 "One Last Time" – Washington, Hamilton, and Company
 "I Know Him" – King George III
 "The Adams Administration" – Burr, Jefferson, Hamilton, Madison, and Company
 "We Know" – Hamilton, Jefferson, Burr, and Madison
 "Hurricane" – Hamilton, Burr, Washington, Eliza, Angelica, Maria, and Company
 "The Reynolds Pamphlet" – Jefferson, Madison, Burr, Hamilton, Angelica, James Reynolds, and Company
 "Burn" – Eliza
 "Blow Us All Away" – Philip, Martha, Dolly, George Eacker, Hamilton, and Company
 "Stay Alive (Reprise)" – Hamilton, Philip, Eliza, Doctor, and Company
 "It's Quiet Uptown" – Angelica, Hamilton, Eliza, and Company
 "The Election of 1800" – Jefferson, Madison, Burr, Hamilton, and Company
 "Your Obedient Servant" – Burr, Hamilton, and Company
 "Best of Wives and Best of Women" – Eliza and Hamilton
 "The World Was Wide Enough" – Burr, Hamilton, Angelica, Philip, and Company
 "Who Lives, Who Dies, Who Tells Your Story" – Eliza, Washington, Angelica, Burr, Jefferson, Madison, Lafayette, Laurens, Mulligan, and Company

End Credits
 "My Shot (Rise Up Remix)" – The Roots featuring Busta Rhymes, Joell Ortiz and Nate Ruess
 "Dear Theodosia" (Instrumental) – Orchestra
 "Exit Music" – Orchestra

Production
The film is edited together from three performances of Hamilton at the Richard Rodgers Theatre in Midtown Manhattan in June 2016 with the original principal Broadway cast members, prior to the departure of Miranda, Leslie Odom Jr., Phillipa Soo, and Ariana DeBose from the production, combined with a few "setup shots" recorded without an audience present. These shots included numbers that were captured with the use of a Steadicam, crane and dolly. The footage, shot by RadicalMedia, was originally filmed to be spliced into the 2016 documentary Hamilton's America. The film includes a one-minute intermission.

The film features the majority of the original Broadway cast, minus ensemble members Betsy Struxness and Emmy Raver-Lampman who left in March and April 2016 respectively – their roles are performed by Hope Easterbrook and Elizabeth Judd. Jonathan Groff, who departed the role of King George III in April and was replaced by Rory O'Malley, returned to the production to reprise his role for the film. He also provides, in character, the voice of the pre-show announcer at the beginning of the film, welcoming the audience to the show.

On February 3, 2020, it was announced that Walt Disney Studios had acquired the worldwide distribution rights for the film for $75 million. Disney successfully outbid multiple competitors, including Warner Bros. Pictures, 20th Century Fox, and Netflix, which had all expressed interest in the film rights. The deal, reportedly one of the most expensive film rights acquisitions, was negotiated by Walt Disney Pictures president Sean Bailey and placed into motion after Disney CEO Bob Iger approached the producers with personal interest in acquiring the film rights. The film is produced by Miranda, Jeffrey Seller, and Kail.

Release
The film was originally scheduled for an October 15, 2021 theatrical wide release by Walt Disney Studios Motion Pictures, but was later moved up to July 3, 2020, on Disney+, as announced by Disney and Miranda on May 12, 2020 in light of the impact of the COVID-19 pandemic on the film industry and the performing arts, which shut down the Broadway, West End, and touring productions. This move was also done to get the film released in time for the Fourth of July weekend, on the 244th anniversary of the independence of the United States.

The film was planned to be released for home media distribution in 2022 after the streaming release.

Hamilton received a PG-13 rating by the MPA for "language and some suggestive material". Two instances of the expletive "fuck" were censored to avoid an R rating; a third, partially unfinished one used in "Say No to This" is retained, making it the first film released by Walt Disney Pictures to feature the expletive. A fourth expletive, "motherfucker", used in "The Adams Administration" is also kept in, but is intentionally bleeped for comedic effect as part of the show and its cast album.

A behind-the-scenes documentary about the making of the film, entitled Hamilton In-Depth with Kelley Carter, premiered on The Undefeated and Disney+ the same day as the film. It features journalist Kelley L. Carter hosting a roundtable discussion with Thomas Kail and members of the cast about the musical's origins, its significance in pop culture, and how its story and portrayal of historical events resonate with the modern-day discussions about social injustice and systemic racism.

Reception

Audience viewership
On the weekend of the film's release, the Disney+ app was downloaded 266,084 times, a 72% increase from the past four weeks' total. TV analytics provider, Samba TV reported that 2.7 million U.S. households streamed the film in its first 10 days on Disney+. In August 2020, it was reported that a "staggering" 37.1% of subscribers (about 22 million) had watched the film over its first month (by comparison, the second-largest viewership portion on a platform was Netflix's Unsolved Mysteries with 13.7%). In November, Variety reported the film was the most watched straight-to-streaming title of 2020 up to that point. In December, research firm Screen Engine reported that Hamilton was the second-most watched straight-to-streaming title of 2020 behind HBO Max's Wonder Woman 1984.

Critical response 
The site's critics consensus reads: "Look around, look around at how beautifully Hamilton shines beyond Broadway – and at how marvelously Thomas Kail captures the stage show's infectious energy." On Metacritic, the film has a weighted average score of 89 out of 100, based on 42 critics, indicating "universal acclaim".

Peter Debruge, in his review for Variety, wrote: "For those fortunate enough to see Hamilton on stage, this will be a welcome reminder of being among the first to witness such a revolutionary piece of American theater. And if you couldn't get tickets at the time (some of which fetched more than the value of Cares Act stimulus payments), this 2 1/2-hour release represents an incredible equalizing moment". Justin Chang of the Los Angeles Times wrote "For those of us who have never seen the stage show, and have compensated by spending many happy hours with the soundtrack, it's a particular pleasure to be figuratively ushered into the live Richard Rodgers Theater audience, whose applause you often hear and whose presence you sometimes glimpse in passing. Unaltered from that initial staging, apart from some seamless editing (by Jonah Moran) and the silencing of a few family-unfriendly expletives, this filmed Hamilton is somehow both a four-year-old time capsule and a timely encounter with the present."

Rafer Guzmán of Newsday gave the film 3 stars out of 4, writing "Directed with a steady hand by Thomas Kail, Hamilton doesn't quite capture the electricity of a live performance, though mid-song laughs and cheers can occasionally be heard from the audience (there's also a one-minute intermission). Hamilton will surely return when Broadway does, but for now this document will serve nicely in its stead." David Ehrlich of IndieWire gave the film a grade of A− and said: "This is Hamilton as you always wanted to see it, and it always will be. And with Disney+ releasing it just in time for the Fourth of July, it doubles as a perfect reminder that America is only worth celebrating because of what it aspires to be — the version of it we see in our minds' eye, and not the one that's petrified on the pages of our history books."

David Rooney, in his review for The Hollywood Reporter, praised Kail's directing by writing "The art of the filmed performance has evolved considerably since the days when a camera or two were plonked down at the rim of the stage and the show unfolded as a static theatrical facsimile. Since staging Hamilton, director Thomas Kail has been sharpening his skills on television work like Grease Live! — still by far the best of the recent spate of live TV musicals — and Fosse/Verdon, a striking hybrid of theatrical performance and conventional narrative."

A. O. Scott of The New York Times named the film a "Critic's Pick", praising the timeliness of its release stating "One lesson that the past few years should have taught — or reconfirmed — is that there aren’t any good old days. [...] This four-year-old performance of 'Hamilton,' viewed without nostalgia, feels more vital, more challenging than ever."

Accolades 
Following its release and acclaim, there was speculation on whether Hamilton would be eligible for Academy Awards consideration. Major publications pointed to previous instances of Academy Award-nominated films featuring stage recordings, such as Othello (1965) and Give ‘em Hell, Harry (1975), suggesting the possibility of recognition for Hamilton. However, on July 6, 2020, the Academy of Motion Pictures Arts and Sciences disqualified Hamilton for the 93rd Academy Awards, citing a rule implemented in 1997 that "Recorded stage productions are not eligible for consideration." Disney included Hamilton in its awards consideration campaign and reportedly submitted the film to every organization and award guild, regardless of apparent eligibility. Unlike the academy, other major organizations that present film awards—such as the Golden Globe Awards and the Screen Actors Guild Awards—have no specific restrictions against filmed theater, and thus recognized the film.

See also
Hamilton (Original Broadway Cast Recording)
List of films about the American Revolution

References

External links
 
 
 
 

2020 films
2020 biographical drama films
2020s musical drama films
Films set in 1776
Films set in 1790
Films set in 1800
Adultery in films
American Revolutionary War films
American biographical films
American musical films
American musical drama films
Cultural depictions of Alexander Hamilton
Cultural depictions of George III
Cultural depictions of George Washington
Cultural depictions of James Madison
Cultural depictions of Gilbert du Motier, Marquis de Lafayette
Cultural depictions of Thomas Jefferson
Disney+ original films
Films about presidents of the United States
Films based on adaptations
Films based on multiple works
Films based on musicals
Films set in a theatre
Films set in Columbia University
Films shot in New York City
Hamilton (musical)
Rap operas
Sung-through musical films
Walt Disney Pictures films
Filmed stage productions
Films not released in theaters due to the COVID-19 pandemic
Films produced by Lin-Manuel Miranda
Films scored by Lin-Manuel Miranda
2020s English-language films
2020s American films